Melittosesia is a genus of moths in the family Sesiidae from Madagascar.

This is a monotypic genus that only contains the species Melittosesia flavitarsa  Bartsch, 2009 that was found in eastern Madagascar near Moramanga and Andasibe in mountainous primary forests. This species has a wingspan of 24–29 mm and a body length of 13–16 mm.

References

Sesiidae
Moths of Madagascar
Moths of Africa
Monotypic moth genera